The 1990 European Tour, titled as the 1990 Volvo Tour for sponsorship reasons, was the 19th official season of golf tournaments known as the PGA European Tour.

The season was made up of 37 tournaments counting for the Order of Merit, and seven non-counting "Approved Special Events".

The Order of Merit was won by Wales' Ian Woosnam for the second time, having previously won in 1987.

Changes for 1990
There were several changes from the previous season, with the addition of the Atlantic Open, the Amex Med Open and the Austrian Open; and the promotion of the Murphy's Cup to full Order of Merit status.

Before the official schedule was announced the Tenerife Open was dropped, but later returned in place of the cancelled Catalan Open. In late February the Jersey Open was cancelled and replaced by a new tournament in Spain, the El Bosque Open.

Schedule
The following table lists official events during the 1990 season.

Unofficial events
The following events were sanctioned by the European Tour, but did not carry official money, nor were wins official.

Order of Merit
The Order of Merit was titled as the Volvo Order of Merit and was based on prize money won during the season, calculated in Pound sterling.

Awards

See also
List of golfers with most European Tour wins

Notes

References

External links
1990 season results on the PGA European Tour website
1990 Order of Merit on the PGA European Tour website

European Tour seasons
European Tour